The Singapore women's national rugby union team are a national sporting side that represents Singapore in women's rugby union. They played their first test match in 2006.

History

The history of women's rugby in Singapore has been a short one. The game was introduced by the Singapore Rugby Union through the men's clubs in 1996.

With the help of the Singapore Rugby Union, the game in the 15s format was introduced to the clubs in 2005 and the first Singapore women's 15s league was established in 2006.

The first Singapore national women's 15s team was formed that year and took part in A.R.F.U.'s Women's Championship 15s in Kunming. Although losing their first four test matches over 2006 and 2007, the team was not to be denied their first win for long. The Singapore Women's National 15s team registered their first victory at the 2008 Asian Women's Championship 15s in Taraz, Kazakhstan when they beat Kyrgyzstan 38–0. The Singapore Women narrowly lost a place in the finals to Japan.

In 2009 Singapore hosted the Asian World Cup qualification tournament.

Record

(Full internationals only)

External links
 Singapore Rugby Union
 Singapore on world.rugby
 Singapore on rugbydata.com

Asian national women's rugby union teams
Women's national rugby union teams
Singapore national rugby union team

fr:Équipe de Singapour de rugby à XV